Herochroma baibarana is a species of moth of the family Geometridae first described by Shōnen Matsumura in 1931. It is found in China, Taiwan, Sri Lanka, the north-eastern parts of the Himalayas, Peninsular Malaysia, Sumatra and Borneo.

References

External links
 
 A study on the genus Herochroma Swinhoe in China, with descriptions of four new species (Lepidoptera: Geometridae: Geometrinae). Acta Entomologica Sinica

Moths described in 1931
Pseudoterpnini
Moths of Asia
Taxa named by Shōnen Matsumura